The Øresund Line is a railway between Copenhagen in Denmark and Malmö in Sweden via the Øresund Bridge. It operates 24/7, and a journey between the two cities takes 35 to 40 minutes. On the Swedish side it is managed by the Swedish Transport Administration, on the Danish side by Banedanmark.

The railway line approaches Copenhagen from the Continental Line south of Malmö and heads west, passing over the Øresund Bridge on the lower section of the Peberholm artificial island, under Copenhagen Airport to Copenhagen Central Station. In Malmö, the City Tunnel connects the railway directly to Malmö C.

Øresund trains are operated by DSB on the Danish side and SJ Öresund on the Swedish side. They connect Copenhagen and Malmö, with onward connections to Gothenburg, Kalmar, and Karlskrona. On the Danish side, many trains continue northwards on the Coast Line to Helsingør. SJ operates SJ 2000 high-speed trains between Stockholm,  Malmö, and Copenhagen. Freight trains are operated by Railion using EG locomotives.

History
Plans for connecting Scania and Zealand with a bridge had been raised throughout the entire 20th century, and in 1991 a company was created to start the work. Construction of the Øresund Bridge and Øresund Railway started in 1995 and was completed in 2000.
According to UIC this rail line had in 2012 the most expensive second class rail tickets in Europe with a price of 0.21 Euro per km. The investigation encompassed 103 rail lines.

Future
It has been proposed to complement the Øresund Line with a metro link called the Øresundsmetro. This would directly connect Malmö to the Copenhagen Metro system and reduce journey times between the two city centres from 35 minutes to 20 minutes.

City Tunnel
Since December 2010, Øresund trains use the City Tunnel in Malmö, with its stations at  Hyllie and Triangeln, thereby saving one minute for passengers to Malmö C and about 15 to 20 minutes for passengers to Triangeln.

Border technicalities
One of the challenges with the line was the incompatibility between the railway electrification systems in Denmark and Sweden. Denmark uses  while Sweden uses .

The signalling systems in the two countries are also different. The problems were overcome by requiring all trains operating on the line to be dual voltage and have dual signalling systems, including a minority of the X2 trains operated throughout Sweden by SJ. The signalling system switches on Peberholm in Denmark, so the entire bridge uses the Swedish signalling, but Danish electrical system. The entire bridge has 200 km/h maximum speed, also the Danish part, as the only railway in Denmark.

On double-track lines in Denmark trains run on the right whereas in Sweden they run on the left. On the Øresund Line trains runs on the right hand track, changing sides at a flyover north of the Malmö C, resulting in trains in the Malmö area using the Danish standard.

On Autumn 2015, border controls started at Hyllie station. They cause a delay in the traffic there. Furthermore, from January 2016, a carrier's responsibility law was in effect, so all passengers had to go through identity check at Copenhagen Airport station, and all passengers from other Danish stations had to disembark, change track and go through the identity check. These checks were abolished in May 2017, after the EU commission declared such checks not acceptable.

Line
 Sweden
Lund Central Station, Lund.
around Arlöv's former sugar factory – change for the dual tracks' left side traffic (in Sweden north of this location) to right side traffic (Danish standard for such railways).
Malmö Central Station (at the underground platforms, which also are non terminal platforms)
Triangeln station, Malmö (an underground railway station).
Hyllie station, Malmö.
Lernacken (not a station, but the location where the fixed connection begins, at the Swedish side) – Enter the Øresund Bridge, change of electric voltage.

 Denmark
Peberholm (not a station but an artificial island) – Change of signalling system and traffic control.
Copenhagen Airport, Kastrup Station (underground railway station), Tårnby. – Metro has a T-junction with the Øresund Railway here
Tårnby Station (underground railway station), Tårnby. 
Ørestad Station, Copenhagen. – Metro crosses the Øresund Railway
Copenhagen Central Station 
Nørreport Station (underground railway station), Copenhagen.
Østerport Station, Copenhagen.
One trains per hour continue to Nivå, through several tunnels in Copenhagen (the Boulevard Line) and the Coast Line (Denmark) ( in Danish)
The Øresundstågs stop at the stations above. A few daily trains to Stockholm stop only at Malmö Central Station, Copenhagen Airport and Copenhagen Central Station.
From Lund C to Østerport Station there is an hourly late night service and the trip lasts exactly 60 minutes.

History
The fixed connection across the Øresund, was inaugurated on 1 July 2000.
Between the inauguration and December 2010, the tunnel through Malmö was not in operation and a far longer path was used. Trains had to drive in to Malmö Central Station and (after some 20 minutes, the train could depart for Copenhagen, but then had "to reverse" for several minutes (that is, reverse out of Malmö the same way the trains came in), followed by a long detour which orbited most of Malmö, before reaching the new fixed connection. 
Malmö South Station was then the last station in Sweden. (But is still in use for local trains and for a few Danish DSB Inter City trains to Ystad, from which car-ferries departure to the Danish Baltic Sea island, Bornholm. (The alternative, car ferries from Danish town Køge to Bornholm takes longer time)

References

External links
 Banverket page on Öresundbanan
 Järnväg.net page on Öresundbanan

 
Line
Railway lines in Denmark
Railway lines in Sweden
International railway lines
Rail transport in the Capital Region of Denmark
Rail transport in Malmö
Scania
Railway lines opened in 2000
Railway lines in highway medians